The Kerch railway bridge, also called the Kerch Bridge, was a short-lived Soviet Russian railway bridge across the Kerch Strait, which connects the Black Sea with the Sea of Azov. Constructed in 1944–1945 and demolished later in 1945, it connected Chushka Spit of the Krasnodar Krai with the Kerch Peninsula of the Crimean ASSR.

Construction began in spring 1944 shortly after the liberation of Crimea by the Red Army. Materials left from an unbuilt bridge of the occupying German forces were used by the Soviets in the construction of their bridge, Although it was opened for transport in autumn that year, construction was still incomplete, and December 1944 storms halted construction. By that time only part of the protective starkwaters were completed, and in February 1945 ice severely damaged the bridge, destroying the bridge pillars. Repair proposals were rejected and remnants of the bridge were disassembled afterwards.

History

Proposals for a bridge across the Kerch Strait 
Proposals of the construction of the Kerch Strait bridge were considered as early as 1903. The bridge was supposed to be a part of a railway between Crimea and the Taman Peninsula. Two routes were considered, northern, from Yenikale to Chushka Spit, and southern, which was to cross Kerch Strait via Tuzla Spit. The northern variant allowed for usage of existing railway infrastructure and therefore was cheaper, but the railroad in this case would be longer and would have passed in the northern part of the Taman Peninsula, avoiding most economically developed areas of it. So the southern route was preferred, and in 1910 Tsar Nicholas II sanctioned geotechnical investigations on this route. The World War I and the Russian Revolution prevented construction from commencing. Not until World War II and the German invasion of the Soviet Union was the idea of a fixed link across the Kerch Strait taken up again.

Following outbreak of the German–Soviet hostilities in 1941, construction of a fixed link across the Kerch Strait gained new importance, to ensure stable supply of military units arose of both combatants. A ropeway construction by the German Organisation Todt (OT) started in 1942 and completed in June 1943. With a daily capacity of 1,000 tons, the ropeway just sufficed to meet the defensive needs of the German 17th Army. On 7 March 1943 Hitler ordered the construction of a combined road and railway bridge over the Strait of Kerch within six months, to push for the German invasion of the North Caucasus. Construction began in April 1943, but before it was completed, in September 1943 concentrated Soviet attacks began on the bridgehead, accelerating the German retreat. When retreating the Wehrmacht blew up the already completed parts of the bridge and destroyed the ropeway.

Soviet construction of a railway bridge 
The Soviet Union, for its own part, closely monitored the state of transport infrastructure in German-occupied Crimea. Since June 1943, when Soviet intelligence learned that Nazi Germany was constructing a Kerch Strait bridge, information about it was allocated a special section in further intelligence reports. Soviet forces restored the ropeway and used it extensively to further the Kerch–Eltigen Operation. The Soviets also were interested in using a bridge: in January 1944, even before the liberation of Kerch by the Red Army (which would take place on 11 April, during the Crimean offensive), the State Defense Committee ordered the construction of a  railway bridge across the strait, demanding that such bridge shall be ready by 15 July 1944. By the time of the liberation of Kerch the engineering design was underway and general construction had begun on the eastern adjacent roads and on the causeway on the Caucasus shore. 470 anti-air platforms, 294 anti-air guns, 132 searchlights, 96 fighters and two radars were involved in defence of the construction site from air attacks and their detection.

To hasten opening of the bridge the construction works were divided into two stages, but the government-demanded deadline was impossible to accomplish. The construction took seven months, and the first train crossed the bridge on 3 November 1944. By that time only structures dedicated for the first stage were created, while to ensure protection of the bridge from storms and ice flows there was still much work to do. Severely worsened weather conditions in December 1944, and more frequent winter storms, prevented completion of construction, and also began to inflict damage on the fixed link itself. In particular, one violent storm propelled a barge towards the eastern causeway and destroyed it.

1945 ice damage and demolition 
In February 1945 drift ice, propelled by a northeastern wind from the Sea of Azov towards the incomplete bridge, inflicted fatal damage, with only five protective starkwaters ready by that time. On 18–19 February 1945, ice destroyed 24 pillars and 26 spans (of 110) fell into the strait; by 20 February 1945, 42 pillars and 48 spans were destroyed. By March 1945, 46 pillars and 53 spans were destroyed, and 1016 pillars out of 2357 were severely damaged. Attempts to weaken the ice by artillery and ground-based ice blasting were ineffective, and aerial bombing of ice was impossible due to very bad weather. Icebreakers were also unable to reach the bridge.

The main reason of the failure was a lack of effective protection of the bridge, resulting largely from the wrong decision to allocate protective measures to a second stage of construction. Other construction (and design) errors contributing to a collapse of the bridge included inconsistency between small-span design and ice regime in that area of the strait, construction of the bridge with incomplete engineering inquiry (which resulted in wavering on the needed ice protection measures), and lack of technical, material and work-force supply of the construction. Much of this stemmed from hurried approach to the project, which also depended on the use of German leftovers from their incomplete bridge.

Design errors meant that even if the bridge was repaired, a collapse similar to one that happened in February 1945 could recur. Coupled with a necessity of massive funding of potentially futile repair works, the proposals to repair the bridge were doomed. On 31 May 1945, the State Defense Committee deemed repair of the destroyed bridge unfeasible, which meant demolition of its remnants.

Design 
The movable spans were of a swing bridge design, rotating horizontally over two adjacent navigable shipping lanes in the strait.

Railway links between Port Kavkaz and Sennaya and Port Krym and Kerch railway stations were also under construction: the first was to be a -long railway, the second one would be -long.

Legacy 

The failure of the 1944-1945 bridge did not mean immediate abandonment of the idea of a fixed link across the Kerch Strait by the Soviet government; indeed, construction of a new, permanent two-purpose (combined road-rail) bridge was decreed in 1949, and preparatory work had already started two years earlier. But in 1950 construction was halted and the Kerch Strait ferry line was created instead. From that time, the bridge idea fell into hibernation for decades: while it was proposed to construct such a link in one form or another from time to time, it did not become a reality or even go beyond proposals.

In 2014, some seven decades after the Soviet decision to build a railway bridge, the situation changed. By then the Soviet Union itself had dissolved and Crimea became separated from Russia not only geographically (by the Kerch Strait), but also by an international border, between Russia and the independent state of Ukraine. But in February and March 2014 Russia annexed Crimea and, amidst international non-recognition of the annexation and worsened relations with Ukraine (which at that time was the only state with overland links to Crimea), decided to build twin permanent road and rail bridges across the Kerch Strait. Dubbed the Crimean Bridge by the Russian government, the link became operational for road transport in 2018, opened to passenger trains at the end of 2019, and commenced carrying freight trains in 2020.

Notes

References 

Demolished bridges
Former railway bridges
Bridges completed in 1944
Buildings and structures demolished in 1945
Bridge disasters in Russia
Bridge disasters caused by construction error
History of Kuban
Transport in Crimea
Kerch Peninsula
Swing bridges
Truss bridges
Kerch Strait
Cross-sea bridges in Europe
1944 establishments in Russia
1945 disestablishments in the Soviet Union